Waechtersbach ceramics is a German ceramics manufacturer in Brachttal near Wächtersbach, which was founded in 1832 by the Prince Adolf of Ysenburg and Büdingen of Isenburg-Wächtersbach. It is a registered company since 4 July 2003.

History
During the early 20th century, Waechtersbach introduced Art Nouveau style ceramics. It made works designed by Joseph Maria Olbrich, Peter Behrens, Hans Christiansen and also worked for the Darmstadt Artists' Colony.

 In 2006, it became part of the Könitz Porzellan company.
 In 2011, it was closed.
 Since 2013, there is a show production for interested people.
 In Spielberg and Streitberg (both are villages in Brachttal) there are ceramic museums with ceramic art made by Waechtersbach ceramics.

References

External links

Waechtersbach USA - Official Homepage
Waechtersbach Germany - Official Homepage
Ceramic Hob Cooktop Safety

Companies established in 1832
Ceramics manufacturers of Germany